is a district of Bunkyō, Tokyo, Japan.

Education
Bunkyo Board of Education operates the local public elementary and middle schools.

Zoned elementary schools for parts of Suidō are: Kanatomi (金富小学校) and Kohinatadaimachi (小日向台町小学校).

Zoned junior high schools for parts of Suidō are: No. 3 (第三中学校), Meidai (茗台中学校), and Otowa (音羽中学校).

References

External links

Districts of Bunkyō
Wards of Tokyo